Pterostyrax psilophyllus is a species of flowering plant in the family Styracaceae. It is endemic to central China.  It is threatened by habitat loss.

References

Styracaceae
Endemic flora of China
Vulnerable plants
Taxonomy articles created by Polbot